Simon Mailloux (born November 2, 1983) is a serving officer in the Canadian Forces. He was severely injured on 16 November 2007 in an IED incident in Afghanistan. As a result, his left leg was amputated.

In November 2009, Mailloux redeployed to Afghanistan becoming the first Canadian amputee to deploy to a war zone as a combatant.

Early years 
Born in 1983 and raised in Quebec City, Quebec, he joined the Air cadet at a young age where he developed a taste for the military environment. He was accepted to the Royal Military College of Canada in 2001 and graduated as an infantry officer in 2006. During the summer of 2005, he received an international exchange scholarship that led him to research security development of the Malian Armed Forces. His research took place at the École de Maintien de la Paix, of Kulikovo, and the Institut de Recherche sur le Développement, of Bamako in Mali during four months.

Military career 

Upon graduation from RMCC, he was posted to the 3rd battalion Royal 22e Régiment in Valcartier, Quebec and quickly joined the unit as a platoon commander preparing for deployment to Afghanistan under Operation Athena. During his deployment, he lost a soldier, Cpl Simon Longtin, in an ambush that the platoon had to fight. Mailloux was subsequently gravely injured in another IED explosion on 16 November 2007 which killed two soldiers, an interpreter and wounded several others. Following his evacuation from the battlefield, Mailloux underwent several surgeries and months of rehabilitation before regaining his ability to walk.

Since February 2008, Mailloux appeared in many provincial and national media outlets explaining his experience and promoting the support of the Canadian Forces veterans. He was one of the first francophone soldier to be injured and played a similar role as Paul Franklin from Edmonton, who was injured in January 2006, in becoming a nationally known advocate for serving amputee soldiers. On 2 March 2008, he participated in the popular Quebec talk show Tout le Monde en Parle and was on the cover of the February 2008 edition of the magazine L'Actualité. With little physical ability to complete an infantry officer job at this time, he was appointed Aide de Camp to the Governor General of Canada at Rideau Hall in Ottawa and helped coordinate the Presidential visit of Barack Obama to Ottawa, the 2009 visit to Haïti and the Emperor and Empress of Japan visit to Canada.

Return to Afghanistan 
In 2009, after he demonstrated his ability to accomplish his tasks as an infantry officer, he was promoted to captain and joined the Task Force Kandahar Headquarters as a Brigade staff in preparation for deployment. When his return to Afghanistan was announced in September 2009, it grabbed media attention and Mailloux as a known injured soldier returning to the battlefield made an appearance on the talk show Canada AM, the Quebec show Dumont 360, the cover of Le Soleil newspaper, CBC Newsworld, the Los Angeles Times. Mailloux is also quoted in General Rick Hillier's book, A Soldier First, as a "young wounded lieutenant that asked if he could return with his comrades". Mailloux was heralded by a Winnipeg Free Press editorial as an example that a serious injury is not stopping a soldier from serving its country and that more place should be made for them.

The decision by the Canadian Armed Forces to send Mailloux back in Afghanistan was controversial, and while a positive sign of acceptance, a second injury or death would have been difficult for the Army. On 9 November 2009, shortly before departing for his tour, Mailloux was among the 46 first recipients of the Sacrifice Medal awarded at Rideau Hall by the Governor General of Canada. His deployment coincided with the surge in American troops ordered by President Obama to try to accomplish the same objective than in Iraq in suppressing the insurgency. Mailloux completed his deployment after nine months, but was followed by other injured soldiers in Canada and from other NATO countries.

Post-Afghanistan years 
Upon his return from Afghanistan, he attended the University of Glasgow for a year before returning to Ottawa to work as a staff with the Counter-IED Task Force and help prevent further injuries like his. On 6 February 2012, Mailloux among other deserving Canadians was awarded one of the first 60 diamond jubilee medal recognizing "his leadership within the Canadian Forces and his efforts to help the soldiers injured during the war in Afghanistan" which were given by the Governor General and the Prime Minister of Canada. Mailloux participated in the 2012 Army Run taking place in Ottawa, Canada and won first place of the 5 km run in the Amputee category. The prize was awarded by Peter Devlin, Commander of the Canadian Army.

In 2013 he was sent back to Quebec city to serve in the 1st battalion Royal 22e Régiment as a company second in command. The Prime Minister of Canada announced a National Day of Honour to be held across Canada on the 9th of May 2014. This celebration was to mark the end of the mission in Afghanistan and the ceremony on Parliament Hill, presented live on all major news channels, was to be Emceed by Rick Hansen, Honorary Colonel, and a representative from the Canadian Forces. On the May 6, 2014, the Prime Minister Stephen Harper announced that Mailloux would be the second emcee for this national event. Harper mentioned that "Captain Mailloux’s unwavering commitment to duty, country and fellow Canadian Armed Forces Veterans has earned him tremendous respect and admiration among military personnel and across Canada. His true grit, strength, sacrifice and dedication are inspirational and serve to remind us all of the fortitude required to serve as a member of the Canadian Armed Forces."

Invictus Games and continuing career 
Over the following years, Mailloux filled different positions in the battalion until he was promoted to major in 2017 and assumed command of A Company 1st battalion Royal 22e Régiment. In October 2016, Mailloux was presented as co-captain for Team Canada for the 2017 [Invictus Games] to be held in Toronto, Canada, in September 2017. The [Invictus Games] were launched by HRH Prince Harry in 2014 as the only international adaptive sporting event for wounded, ill, and injured active duty and veteran service members. In parallel to his company command, Mailloux led with co-captain Natasha Dupuis a team of 90 Canadian athletes from across Canada and lit the torch during the opening ceremony for the Games at the Air Canada centre accompanied by his family and Dupuis. 

Mailloux had been competing in the 2016 Invictus Games in Orlando, Florida and at that time, he commented that Prince Harry's contribution was particularly meaningful because of his service. "For us, he's the best patron," he said. "He's also a brother in arms. He's been there with us. He understands what we've been through." In 2018, Mailloux capped a year-long training with exercise maple resolve which are manoeuvres where "the Van Doos were put through their paces in order to successfully achieve ‘high readiness’ status, enabling them to deploy anywhere in the world at a moment's notice." Mailloux subsequently deployed to Ukraine under operation Unifier which aimed to train and help the Ukrainian Armed Forces to confront separatist forces supported by Russia.

While he left the battalion with a completed tour where he received a commendation from the Commander of the Canadian Joint Operations Command, in 2019 Mailloux was sent to the Canadian Forces College in Toronto to complete the Joint Command and Staff Programme. He accomplished different staff appointments before being promoted to lieutenant-colonel in 2021. He is currently employed as an action officer with the Joint Staff in Washington D.C.

Social involvement 
Mailloux participates in the annual Army Run taking place in Ottawa along with other Canadian war veterans. He is also involved with the Canadian Forces Soldier On program in raising funds to buy adaptive equipment for wounded soldiers across the country.

Mailloux was the gala dinner keynote speaker for the Canadian Institute for Military and Veterans Health Research (CIMVHR) during the 2013 Forum held in Edmonton. Mailloux was introduced by the Minister of Veterans Affairs, Julian Fantino, and "spoke about his experience with losing a limb in Afghanistan, how he was able to rehabilitate and eventually return to combat. His story was truly inspirational to all who attend the Forum.". Mailloux's experience as an amputated serving soldier is respected among the Canadian Forces and many applaud his leadership in the care of our injured and veterans as is exemplified by his public work. He is now recognized as a role-model who inspires others to overcome their injuries and push their limits.

Honours and decorations 
Mailloux received the following honours and decorations during his military career.

References 

Royal 22nd Regiment officers
Living people
Canadian military personnel of the War in Afghanistan (2001–2021)
1983 births
People from Quebec City
Royal Military College of Canada alumni